Phalonidia memoranda is a species of moth of the family Tortricidae. It is found in North America, where it has been recorded from Ontario, Connecticut, Indiana, Maryland, Massachusetts, Quebec and Vermont.

The wingspan is about 11 mm. Adults have been recorded on wing in May and July.

References

Moths described in 1997
Phalonidia